Parting the Sea Between Brightness and Me is the second studio album by the American post-hardcore band Touché Amoré. The album was released on June 7, 2011, through Deathwish Inc. It was recorded and produced in five days with Ed Rose at his own Black Lodge Recording studio in Eudora, Kansas. The band was recorded live to give the album a more "honest/raw" feel. The band said they chose to work with Rose because of the work he had done with The Casket Lottery.

To promote Parting the Sea Between Brightness and Me, Touché Amoré released one part of the album cover per week through the guitarist Nick Steinhardt's blog. The group also made "Amends", "Home Away from Here" and "~" available for online streaming before the official release of the album. On its release, the album received generally positive reviews from music critics. At Metacritic, which assigns a normalized rating out of 100 to reviews from mainstream critics, the album received an average score of 81, based on 7 reviews, which indicates "universal acclaim".

Track listing

Personnel
Parting the Sea Between Brightness and Me personnel adapted from CD liner notes.

Touché Amoré
 Elliot Babin – drums, piano
 Jeremy Bolm – vocals, lyrics
 Tyler Kirby – bass guitar, backing vocals
 Nick Steinhardt – guitar
 Clayton Stevens – guitar

Production
 Ed Rose – production, engineering, mixing
 Carl Saff – mastering

Artwork
 Ryan Aylsworth – photography
 Nick Steinhardt – art direction, design

References

External links
Track by track breakdown of Parting the Sea...

2011 albums
Deathwish Inc. albums
Touché Amoré albums
Albums produced by Ed Rose